Economy of Coimbatore is heavily influenced by information technology, engineering and textiles. Coimbatore is called the Manchester of South India due to its extensive textile industry, and IT industry, small and medium scale enterprise gdp(gross domestic product) of Coimbatore city is around $18 billion in 2021.It is second largest city by GDP in Tamil Nadu. The city has four special economic zones [SEZ], ELCOT SEZ, KGISL SEZ, SPAN Venture SEZ, Aspen SEZ and at least five more SEZs are in the pipeline. In 2010, Coimbatore ranked 15th in the list of most competitive (by business environment) Indian cities.

Coimbatore has trade associations like CODISSIA, COINDIA and COJEWEL representing industries in the city.
Coimbatore also has a  trade fair ground, built in 1999. It was named COINTEC due to its hosting of INTEC (Small Industries Exhibition). The Trade Fair complex, one of the country's largest, was built in six months, and is owned by CODISSIA (Coimbatore District Small Industries Association). It is also the country's largest pillar-free hall, according to the Limca Book of Records.

Textiles

Coimbatore houses a large number of small, medium and large textile mills, along with a number of textile research institutes. The city also houses two of the Centers Of Excellences (COE) for technical textiles proposed by 
Government of India, namely Meditech, a medical textile research centre based at SITRA, and InduTech based in PSG College of Technology. There are several large textile mills in the city such as Lakshmi Mills, Shiva Texyarn Limited, Bannari Amman Spinning Mill, SKS spinning mills, Kadri Mills, Varadharaja Textile Mill, KPR Mills, Premier Mills, world-famous micro cotton towel producers - Sharadha Terry Products etc.

National Textile Corporation is a company owned by the Indian government has 5 Mill units in Coimbatore.

 Coimbatore Murugan Mills
 Cambodia Mills
 Coimbatore Spinning and Weaving Mill
 Pankaja Mills
 Sri Rangavilas Mills

The neighbouring town of Tirupur is home to some of Asia's largest garment manufacturing companies, exporting hosiery clothes worth more than  50,000 million.

Manufacturing

Coimbatore has a large and a diversified manufacturing sector facilitated by the presence of Sakthi Group, Bannari Amman Group, Lakshmi Machine Works, Larsen & Toubro, Baker Hughes, Alstom, ZF Friedrichshafen, Mahle GmbH, Konecranes, Pricol, PEEPL Automation, V-Guard Industries, Suzlon, ARGO-HYTOS, Titan, Flowserve, KSB, Makino, Messer, Gilbarco Veeder-Root, Bradken, Rieter, VWR International, Hella, Shanthi Gears, ITC Limited, ACC Cements, TTK Prestige, Kirloskar Group, Hirotec, ELGI Equipments, Roots Industries, Salzer Electronics, Mak Controls and systems, Texmo Industries, SE Electricals, FASCO Coimbatore(Factory Automation and Solutions Company) and others. Larsen & Toubro has huge manufacturing facility spread over 300 acre own campus. And there are more than 25,000 small, medium, large sale industries in the city. Coimbatore also has Engineering SEZ in the outskirts of city "Aspen SEZ" spread over 376 acres. CODISSIA Industrial Park is being set up at Moperipalayam nearly 260 acres and at Kallapalayam nearly 150 acres. The city already has industrial estates owned by SIDCO at Kurichi, SIDCO at Malumichampatti, Electrical & Electronics Industrial Estate at Kalapatti and Sree Suba Ganesh Industrial estate near Kovilpalayam. The large number of engineering colleges in the region producing about 50,000 engineers.

Lakshmi Machine Works is India's largest textile machinery and CNC Machine Tool manufacturers based out of Coimbatore.

Engineering procurement and tooling
More than 50,000 engineering units function in and around Coimbatore city. What began as a focused centre for the manufacture of textile motors in the early 1900s has today become a multidisciplinary entity that is capable of catering to voluminous demands in the international market. Tooling Divisions were incepted primarily as captive units for manufacturing houses and have become a major engineering activity in the city today. Today several such companies offer precision tooling services to global industries. The light engineering industry in the Coimbatore region also specializes in offering customized engineering solutions for diverse requirements.

Automotive engineering and components

Coimbatore has emerged as one of the most trusted outsourcing destinations for the auto component industry. Several factors have contributed to this growth, including ready availability of resources and skilled technical talent. Technical Partnerships and strategic alliances with global manufacturers have given the Coimbatore auto component industry more mileage in the international market. Today, auto majors with a growing presence in India source both major components and sub-assemblies from the city. Several international automotive manufacturers source components ranging from exhaust systems to braking systems, seating, electronic and electrical components, mechanical engine parts, body components and suspensions and radiators among others. Many auto component manufacturing companies are OE partners to multinational brands. Textool was one such company that once designed and supplied Sten Guns to the Indian Government after independence. They also developed the first in-house-designed car in the 1960s, which never saw the light of day due to the license raj. They made several prototypes until the 1990s. They successfully manufactured India's first indigenously developed diesel engines in 1972 for cars and their own CNC lathes in 1982. Today their spin-off company, Jayem Automotives Pvt Ltd, offers R & D services to Tata Motors, Renault, Volvo, Eicher, Daimler, TVS, Hero Motors and Robert Bosch GmbH. Maruti Suzuki and Tata Motors source up to 30% of their automotive components from Coimbatore. Some of the countries leading auto component makers based from in Coimbatore include Pricol, Hirotec, Craftsman Automation and Roots Industry. Apart from this Robert Bosch GmbH has a large technical centre in the city.

Wet grinders and Home appliances
Coimbatore has more than 700 wet grinder manufacturers with a monthly output, of 75,000 units per every 100,000 produced in India, as of 2015. The term "Coimbatore Wet Grinder" was given a Geographical indication for wet grinders manufactured in Coimbatore in 2006. Coimbatore is also home to a common facility for the manufacturers of wet grinders.

Motor and pumps
Coimbatore is also called as the Pump City of Asia and has played a dominant role in the agricultural sector since independence and holds a major portion of the total Indian market share. The first motor to be manufactured in India came from a small engineering shop in Coimbatore. Today, the pump and motor manufacturing sector is among the largest engineering activities in the city. The pump manufacturing industry in Coimbatore. Over the years, the city has become as well known for its pumps as it has for its textiles. Many brands in the international market are Coimbatore based companies and the quality and technical superiority of the products has helped the sector cater to both domestic and global demands. Apart from a leading presence in the water pump market, the city's manufacturing houses also specialize in the manufacture of industrial pumps. The motor and pump industry supplies over 40% of India's requirements.

Jewellery and gems 
Coimbatore is one of the major gold jewellery manufacturing hubs in India, renowned for making cast jewellery and machine made jewellery. The city is home to about 3000 jewellery manufacturing companies and to over 40,000 goldsmiths. The jewellery manufacturers have an active association called Coimbatore Jewellery Manufacturers' Association, and have also jointly established Coimbatore Gem and Jewellery Industries Private Limited (Cojewel), which is a common facility with niche goldsmith machinery to be used by the members of the association.

Several jewellery retail chains like Kirtilal's are based in Coimbatore or have their manufacturing base in Coimbatore. Owing to the presence of a large number of jewellery manufacturers and the strong engineering base, the city is home to a number of companies manufacturing jewellery making machinery. The city is also a major diamond cutting centre in South India. For example, Kirtilal's Jewellers alone have 5 diamond cutting and polishing centres in Coimbatore.

Information Technology and BPO

The city is the second largest software producer in Tamil Nadu, next only to Chennai. IT and BPO industry in the city has grown greatly with the launch of TIDEL Park Coimbatore & Wipro Software Development Centre in ELCOT SEZ, KCT TechPark, Hanudev Infopark, Rathinam Technopark, KGISL Campus, Span Venture SEZ, Elysium Central and other planned IT parks in and around the city. It is ranked at 17th among the global outsourcing cities. Companies like Amazon, Accenture, Bosch, Birlasoft, Cognizant, Capgemini, Deloitte, Ford, Flextronics, IBM, Tata Consultancy Services, Infosys, Wipro, HCL, Tech Mahindra, Ericsson, L&T Infotech, Cameron International, NTT DATA, Harman, Hexaware, ThoughtWorks, McWane, Mindtree, Tessolve, Applied Materials, IQVIA, Owler, UST Global, Visteon, VWR International having a presence in the city. Cognizant has second largest headcount in the country with more than 16000+ employees in the city. And Bosch has one of the largest development center in Coimbatore outside Germany with 8300+ employees in the city. Software export stood more than 15,000 crores for the financial year 2018–2019, which is second largest in the state after Chennai.

With abundance of engineering colleges and availability of skilled resources Coimbatore is becoming a go-to destination for the technology startups recently, companies like RFPIO, headquartered in Portland, USA is building enterprise scale products with engineering team operating from Coimbatore.

TICEL Bio-Park III, a Bio-Technology Park constructed in 10 acres of land at Somayampalayam, Coimbatore.

Due to huge demand from IT Companies for space at Coimbatore, ELCOT IT park is being constructed at 114 Crores in ELCOT SEZ which is set to open in 2023 and TIDEL Park Coimbatore-Phase-II is planned to be built within ELCOT SEZ in additional 6 acres of land with 5 Lakh sq.feet space at 250 crores.

SEZ

 Aspen SEZ -Manufacturing
 KGISL SEZ  - IT/ITS & Hardware
 ELCOT SEZ - IT/ITS
 SPAN SEZ  - IT/ITS

IT Parks

 TIDEL Park Coimbatore in ELCOT SEZ @ Peelamedu
 IndiaLand Techpark @ KGISL SEZ, Keeranatham
 SVB Tech Park @ Kalapatti
 ELCOT IT Park in ELCOT SEZ @ Peelamedu-Opening in April-2023
 Hanudev Infopark @ Nava India, Avinashi Road
 Global Tech Park @ Kalapatti
 KCT TechPark @ Saravanampatti
 KGISL Campus @ Saravanampatti
 Mohan Business Park @ Saravanampatti to Thudiyalur Road
 Rathinam TechnoPark @  Eachanari
 Embassy Tech Zone @ Span Venture SEZ, Eachanari
 TICEL Bio-Park III @ Marudhamalai road
 TechZone IT Park at GD Naidu Road-Planned
 STPI @ GCT, Coimbatore-Planned
 L&T IT Park @ L&T highways road-Initial Stage

Industrial Parks

 Codissia Industrial Park-I -Kallapalayam
 Codissia Industrial Park-II -Mopperipalayam
 SIDCO Industrial. Estate-Kuruchi
 SIDCO Industrial. Estate-Malumichampatti
 Sree Suba Ganesh Industrial Estate-Kuppepalayam
 Electronics Industrial Estate- Civil Aerodrome Post
 Annamalai Industrial Park, Kalapatti
 Sulur Industrial Estate-Kannampalayam
 Nethaji Industrial Estate-Devampalayam -Proposed
 Defense & Aero Park- Sulur-Planned
 ADD ELCINA Electronics Park, Annur-Proposed

Logistics Parks
 Amazon Fulfillment Center- Coimbatore
 Flipkart Fulfillment Center- Coimbatore
 Ecom Express Fulfillment Center- Coimbatore
 IndoSpace Skill Logistics Park - Coimbatore
 Safexpress Logistics Park
 Marudhamalai Andavar Industrial & Logistics Park, Coimbatore by TVS Industrial & Logistics Park Pvt Ltd
 Adithya Warehouse

Aerospace & Defence
Coimbatore is being selected for Defense Corridor of Tamil Nadu and State Government is planned to set up Defense & Aero Park at Sulur around 500 acres. And already major MNC's have huge manufacturing plant in the city for Aerospace & Defense products.

 Larsen & Toubro @ Malumichampatti
 L&T MBDA Missile Systems @ Aspen SEZ, Karumathampatti
 Lakshmi Machine Works
 Pricol
 Roots Industries
 Circor International @ Thennampalayam
 HAL AMCA @ Sulur-Planned

Central Government Units 

 Indian Air Force @ Sulur
 INS Agrani @ Red Fields, Puliakulam
 Indian Army Regiment @ Madukkarai
 Central Reserve Police Force @ Thoppampatti

Railways & Telecommunication

Indian Railways has Manufacturing Plant in the city for Signal & Telecommunication and it is one of the important Telecommunication manufacturing facility for Indian Railways.

Southern Railway Signal & Telecom(S&T) Workshop in Podanur- Largest Telecom & Signal Industry among all 7 S&T across the country.

A French multinational company operating worldwide in rail transport markets having Asia's largest Comeponent manufacturing facility in the city.
Alstom

Paper

ITC Limited has a manufacturing facility in Coimbatore for Paperboards & Speciality Paper division.

Government Printing Press

Government of India Press,Coimbatore is a printing agency spread across 132.07 acre campus in Press colony at Coimbatore in the state of Tamil Nadu, which is owned and managed by the Government of India and responsible for printing national and public documents.

Cements
ACC Cements have huge cement manufacturing plant in Coimbatore

Poultry and food products
Coimbatore has a large number of poultry farms and is one of the major producers of chicken, eggs and processed meat amounting to nearly 95% of the chicken meat exports from the country. Major companies include Suguna Foods and Shanthi Feeds.

Coimbatore has some of the oldest flour mills in India. The large-scale flour mills, which cater to all the southern states, have a combined grinding capacity of more than 50,000 MT per month. The city houses many famous high-capacity flour mills like India Roller Flour Mills (now closed) and Coimbatore Roller Flour Mills.

Retail and e-commerce 

There are a number of retail outlets, supermarkets and shopping malls in Coimbatore.
The city has major shopping malls include Brookefields Mall, Fun Republic Mall and Prozone Mall. Popular cinemas include INOX, The Cinema by SPI Cinemas, Cinépolis, Miraj Cinemas, Maharaja Multiplex, SDC Cinemas and KG Cinemas. Coimbatore is already the largest non-metro city for e-commerce in South India, due to growing online shopping, e-ticketing and e-billing adaptation in the city.

Malls
 Brookefields Mall
 Fun Republic Mall
 Prozone Mall

Branded Cinemas
 The Cinema by PVR Cinemas - 6 Screens 
 Cinépolis - 5 Screens
 INOX- 9 Screens
 Miraj Cinemas - 5 Screens
  Broadway Cinemas / IMAX - 9 Screens [Coming Soon in April-2023]

Hospitality
In the recent years, the city has seen growth in the hospitality industry.

5-Star Hotels
 Radisson Blu
 Le Méridien
 Vivanta by Taj
 The Residency Towers
 Welcomhotel by ITC Hotels
 Kenilworth Hotel [Planned]

4-Star Hotels
 Zone by The Park Hotel
 Zone Connect Hotel
 Hash 6 Hotel
 Lemon Tree Hotel
 Fairfield by Marriott
 Gokulam Park 
 Hotel Rajpark [under Construction]

3-Star Hotels
 Ibis Coimbatore City Centre
 Hotel Heritage Inn
 Hotel Vijay Elanza
 Holiday Residency
 Hotel LeGrand
 Hotel CAG pride
 The Orbis
 Jenney Club

See also 

 List of districts in Tamil Nadu by Human Development Index
 Economy of Salem, Tamil Nadu

References

External links

Economy of Coimbatore
Economy of Tamil Nadu